The joberg2c was the longest mountain biking stage race in South Africa if not the world. It took place over nine days and covered approximately 900 kilometres (exact distances vary from year to year) from Heidelberg in Gauteng to Scottburgh on the KwaZulu-Natal coast.

Race overview
joberg2c's organising team was led by Craig Wapnick, Gary Green and Glen Haw. Green and Haw are responsible for the successful Berg and Bush and sani2c mountain bike stage races respectively. The middle and last three days of the joBerg2c overlap with Berg and Bush and sani2c in varying degrees.

The event was fully serviced – each rider (team of two or solo) is allocated a tent and three meals per day at the eight overnight stops or race villages. Additional services such as massage therapists and bike mechanics are also available. 

The joberg2c is a GPS navigated event. Every rider uses a GPS to follow the tracks. 

Furthermore, top tier amateur and semi-pro riders can now apply for sponsorship on the condition that they are serious contenders for the main prize purse. This is aimed at developing talent in the cycling community, especially riders from a previously disadvantaged background. There are also a number of entries available for media representatives.

Tour de Farms
One of the differentiating factors of this race was that the bulk of the route crossed more than 90 private farms. Riders traversed a variety of agricultural holdings including game, dairy and cattle country, maize lands, rose and stud farms, sugarcane fields and pine plantations.

Route breakdown
The 910-kilometre route takes riders across the country’s agricultural hinterland – from Heidelberg in Gauteng, through the north-eastern Free State and along the foothills of the Drakensberg to Scottburgh in KwaZulu-Natal.

The route consisted of a combination of single track, 4x4 Isuzu track and private dirt roads, as well as short stretches on district by-ways. Although the basic skeleton of the route remains unchanged from year to year, the exact distances varied as organisers aim to add more and more single track.

Day one: Heidelberg to Frankfort distance 116 km, ascent 855m, descent 867m
Day two: Frankfort to Reitz distance 93 km, ascent 1001m, descent 916m
Day three: Reitz to Sterkfontein Dam distance 122 km, ascent 1118m, descent 1082m
Day four: Sterkfontein Dam to Emseni distance 93 km, ascent 1100m, descent 1706m
Day five: Emseni to Nottingham Rd distance 122 km, ascent 2241m, descent 1757m
Day six: Nottingham Rd to Glencairn Farm distance 98 km, ascent 2022m, descent 1997m
Day seven: Glencairn Farm to Mackenzie Club distance 82 km, ascent 914, descent 1356m
Day eight: Mackenzie Club to Jolivet distance 99 km, ascent 1705m, descent 2163m
Day nine: Jolivet to Scottburgh distance 84 km, ascent 854m, descent 1551m

Racing categories and prizes
The joberg2c was one of the best mountain bike races in the country but for most, it is more of a ride. There are three racing snake sections (men's, ladies' and mixed) that receive prize money for the overall classification, although serious riders in the sub-veteran, veteran and masters categories may compete for the same prizes.

Previous winners

References

External links
 http://www.go2berg.co.za

Mountain biking events in South Africa
Recurring sporting events established in 2010
Autumn events in South Africa

joberg2c 2022 was the final year of joberg2c.  go2berg is the new event created by Craig Wapnick and Gary Green